Westfield is an unincorporated community in Morrow County, in the U.S. state of Ohio.

History
A post office called Westfield was established in 1821, and remained in operation until 1907. Westfield once had its own schoolhouse.

References

Unincorporated communities in Morrow County, Ohio
1821 establishments in Ohio
Populated places established in 1821
Unincorporated communities in Ohio